The Peach Season is a play by the Australian playwright Debra Oswald. It premiered at Sydney's Griffin Theatre Company in March 2006.
The play was short-listed for the New South Wales Premier's Literary Awards.

The Peach Season evokes the heat, scent and hard slog of a peach farm at harvest time. When a desperate brother and sister turn up looking for picking work, it triggers strong feelings, bad decisions and danger.

Summary

Celia owns the farm. She left Sydney, with baby Zoe in her arms, sixteen years ago when her husband was killed as a bystander in an armed robbery. She has constructed a small haven, keeping her daughter safe from the dangers of the world. But Zoe is chafing against Celia's protectiveness.

This is a moving and suspenseful story about intoxicating first love and the burning love of a mother for a child. It's a story about our overwhelming desire to protect the people we love and the painful necessity to let children go out into the world.

Details of Premiere Production 

A Griffin Theatre Company production at the SBW Stables Theatre. Previewed 10–14 March 2006 and played 15 March-22 April 2006.

Director David Berthold
Designer Alice Babidge
Lighting Designer Stephen Hawker
Sound Designer Jeremy Silver
CELIA Anne Looby
ZOE Maeve Dermody
SHEENA Alice Parkinson
KIERAN Scott Timmins
DOROTHY Maggie Blinco
JOE John Adam

References 

 Interview with Debra Oswald in Sydney Morning Herald
 Production information from Griffin Theatre Company, with reviews
 Publication details - Currency Press

Australian plays
2006 plays